Nogometni klub Jadran Dekani, commonly referred to as Jadran Dekani or simply Dekani, is a Slovenian football club from Dekani which plays in the Slovenian Second League, the second tier of Slovenian football. The club was founded in 1938.

Honours
Slovenian Second League
 Winners: 1992–93

References

External links

Association football clubs established in 1938
Football clubs in Slovenia
1938 establishments in Slovenia